A suspect is a person suspected of committing a crime.

Suspect or suspects may also refer to:

Film and television
 Suspect (1960 film), a British thriller directed by Roy and John Boulting
 Suspect (1987 film), an American legal thriller starring Cher and Dennis Quaid
 Suspect, a 2007 made-for-TV film directed by Guy Ritchie
 Suspect (2008 film), a German short film
 "Suspect", an episode of American television series Smallville
 Suspect (TV series), a 2008 British children's TV series featuring mystery solving
 Suspects (TV series), a 2014 British police procedural TV series
 The Suspect (1916 film), an American silent film
 The Suspect (1944 film), an American film directed by Robert Siodmak
 Suspect (1961 film), an Australian television play
 The Suspect (1975 film), an Italian thriller-drama film
 The Suspect (1981 film), an Egyptian romance film
 The Suspect (1998 film), a Hong Kong action film
 The Suspect (2013 South Korean film), a South Korean spy-action thriller film
 The Suspect (2013 American film), a thriller movie directed and written by Stuart Connelly
  The Suspect (TV series), a 2022 British police procedural TV series

Other uses
 Suspects, a late 1970s California rock band that included founders of the Paisley Underground genre
 Suspect, a 2013 novel by Robert Crais
 Suspect (video game), a 1984 computer game
 Suspect (rapper), British rapper

See also
 Suspekt, Danish musical group
 Suspicion (disambiguation)